Amaradix is a genus of fleas in the family Ceratophyllidae, which comprises two known species.

Species
 Amaradix bitterrootensis (Dunn, 1923)
 Amaradix euphorbi (Rothschild, 1905)

References 

Siphonaptera genera
Ceratophyllidae